Kassorola is a commune in the Cercle of San in the Ségou Region of Mali. The administrative center is the town of Nianasso. In a 2009 census, this regions total population was 16,275.

References

External links
.

Communes of Ségou Region